Soaw may refer to:

Soaw, Burkina Faso, a town in Boulkiemdé Province, Burkina Faso
Soaw Department, a department of Boulkiemdé Province, Burkina Faso
School of the Americas Watch, an American political advocacy group